Lugu may refer to:

Kampong Lugu, settlement in Brunei-Muara District, Brunei
Lugu, Nantou, township in Nantou County, Taiwan
Lugu, Tibet, village in the Tibet Autonomous Region of China
Lugu Lake, on the border of Sichuan and Yunnan provinces, China